Shane Robinson (born 24 August 1967) is a former cricketer from New Zealand. He played 45 first-class and 39 List A matches for Otago between 1984 and 1997.

See also
 List of Otago representative cricketers

References

External links
 

1967 births
Living people
New Zealand cricketers
Otago cricketers
Cricketers from Dunedin